Pierre François Marie Auguste Dejean (10 August 1780 – 17 March 1845), was a French soldier and entomologist. Dejean described a large number of beetles in a series of catalogues.

A soldier of fortune during the Napoleonic Wars, he rose to the rank of lieutenant general and aide de campe to Napoleon. He amassed vast collections of Coleoptera, some  even collected on the battlefield at Waterloo. At the battle of Alcanizas he took time out of battle to pick up a beetle that he pinned on to cork on the inside of his helmet. After victory, he was pleased to find the beetle intact. He listed 22,399 species in his cabinets in 1837—at the time, the greatest collection of Coleoptera in the world. In 1802, he began publishing a catalogue of his vast collection, including 22,000 species names. Dejean was an opponent of the Principle of Priority in nomenclature. "I have made it a rule always to preserve the name most generally used , and not the oldest one; because it seems to me that general usage should always be followed and that it is harmful to change what has already been established". Dejean acted accordingly and often introduced in litteris names, given by himself to replace those already published by other authors. They became invalid. Dejean was president of the Société entomologique de France for the year 1840. In 1834, he was elected a foreign member of the Royal Swedish Academy of Sciences. He died on 17 March 1845.

Works
Catalogue des Coléoptères de la collection d'Auguste Dejean (1802)
Catalogue de la collection de Coléoptères de M. le Baron Dejean (1821)
Catalogue des Coléoptères de la collection de M. le Comte Dejean (1833–1836)
Catalogue des Coléoptères de la collection de M. le Comte Dejean. Troisième édition, revue, corrigée et augmentée. (1836–1837)
 with Pierre André Latreille  Histoire naturelle et iconographie des insectes coléoptères d'Europe Paris : Crevot, 1822. digitised at Gallica.
Spécies Général des Coléoptères, de la collection de M. le Comte Dejean (1825–1838)

Beetles
 
  
Carabus sylvestris transsylvanicus, described in 1826

References

d'Aguilar, J. 2008,  Dejean, une légende entomologique. Insectes (149): 17-18
Barber, H. S. and  Bridwell, J. C., 1940 Dejean Catalogue names (Coleoptera). Bulletin of the Brooklyn Entomological Society, Lancaster, Pa. 35 (1): 1-12
Madge, R. B. 1988,  [Dejean, P. F. M. A.] Arch. Nat. Hist., London 15 (3): 317-321
Peyerimhoff, P. de 1932,  La Société entomologique de France (1832–1931).  Soc. Ent. France, Livre du Centenaire, Paris : 1-86m Plates. I-XIII

External links

Portrait and Short account of Dejean
Internet Archive Spècies Général des Coléoptères, de la collection de M. le Comte Dejean Volume 1
Internet Archive Spècies Général des Coléoptères, de la collection de M. le Comte Dejean Volume 2
Internet Archive Spècies Général des Coléoptères, de la collection de M. le Comte Dejean Volume 3
Internet Archive Spècies Général des Coléoptères, de la collection de M. le Comte Dejean Volume 4
Internet Archive Spècies Général des Coléoptères, de la collection de M. le Comte Dejean Volume 5
Internet Archive Spècies Général des Coléoptères, de la collection de M. le Comte Dejean Volume 6 (Species général des hydrocanthares et gyriniens, by Charles Aubé)
 Gaedike, R.; Groll, E. K. & Taeger, A. 2012: Bibliography of the entomological literature from the beginning until 1863 : online database - version 1.0 - Senckenberg Deutsches Entomologisches Institut. Links to collection details and biographies.

1780 births
1845 deaths
French entomologists
Grand Croix of the Légion d'honneur
Members of the Royal Swedish Academy of Sciences
Burials at Père Lachaise Cemetery
French commanders of the Napoleonic Wars
People from Amiens
Presidents of the Société entomologique de France
19th-century French zoologists
Barons of the First French Empire
Counts of France
Coleopterists